Togger is a 1937 German drama film directed by Jürgen von Alten and starring Paul Hartmann, Renate Müller, Heinz Salfner. It was Müller's final film before her mysterious death the same year. The making of the film was portrayed in the 1960 film Sweetheart of the Gods.

Selected cast

References

External links

Films of Nazi Germany
German drama films
1937 drama films
Films directed by Jürgen von Alten
Films about journalists
Films set in the 1920s
German black-and-white films
1930s German films